Henry A. Bamman (June 13, 1918-February 14, 2000) was an American author, professor and teacher. His titles focuses were adventure and science fiction. He had co-authored many books with Helen Huus and Robert J Whitehead.

Early life and career
Henry A. Bamman was born in Macon, Missouri. He had interest in writing adventure and science fiction books. His first occupation was a teacher in Macon County, Missouri, public school district. Then he became a professor at University of Colorado Denver as an instructor in English. He also became an assistant professor in English at Eastern Washington College of Education. Bamman was assistant director of counseling center at Stanford University. Bamman later became a professor of education in Sacramento State College located in Sacramento, California. He left education professor because he was serving as a project planning director for Field Educational Publications, Inc. In 1978, he was invited to speak at Truman State University as a Baldwin Lecturer. He spoke on "Crisis and change".

Bibliography

1982
 Amazing
 Daredevils and dreamers
 Extraordinary episodes
 Fantastic flights
 Challenges

Top Flight Readers (1977)
 Bush Pilot
 Chopper
 Test Pilot
 Hang Glider
 Barnstormers
 Balloon
 The top flight readers : teacher's manual

Space Science Fiction Series (1970)
 Space Pirate
 Milky Way
 Bone people
 Planet of the Whistlers
 Ice men of Rime
 Inviso man

Mystery Adventure Series (1969)
 Mystery adventure of the jeweled bell
 Mystery adventure at Longcliff Inn
 Mystery adventure of the Indian burial ground
 Mystery adventure of the smuggled treasures
 Mystery adventure of the talking statues
 Mystery Adventure at Cave Four

The Checkered flag series
 Wheels (1967)
 Riddler (1967)
 Bearcat (1967)
 Smashup (1967)
 Scramble (1969)
 Flea (1969)
 Grand Prix (1969)
 Five Hundred (500) (1968)
 A teacher's manual for the checkered flag series (1968, 1972)

World of Adventure Series
 The Lost Uranium Mine (1964)
 Flight to the South Pole (1965)
 Hunting Grizzly Bears (1963)
 Fire on the Mountain (1963)
 City Beneath the Sea (1964)
 The Search for Piranha (1964)
 Sacred Well of Sacrifice (1964)
 Viking Treasure (1965) 
 Teacher's Guide: World of Adventure Series (1965)

Personal life
Bamman married Ruth G. Wiren on June 12, 1948, just one day before his birthday. He has two children, a son whose name is Richard and a daughter whose name is Elin Kristina.

Death
He died on February 14, 2000, in Rocklin, California, at the age of 81. He is survived by his wife Ruth G. Wiren and his son and daughter.

References

External links
 Henry A. Bamman on LibraryThing

2000 deaths
Truman State University people
1918 births
People from Macon, Missouri
University of Colorado Denver faculty
20th-century American writers
People from Rocklin, California
20th-century American male writers